The Piran Minorite Monastery is a Roman Catholic monastery located on the hill above Piran, a port town on the coast of the Adriatic Sea in southwestern Slovenia. It is operated by the Conventual Franciscans.

History

Early history
The first church on top of the hill was already built in 1301, when a nearby church begun to be built by Greyfriars. Historiographers of the monastery (Trani, Granić in Frasson) wrote that Giuseppe Tartini received his first musical education in the monastery where his parents hired a room for him after 1700 A.D. From 1954 to 1990, it was nationalized and with denationalization it was given back to the church in 1996.

Tartini family
At 300th anniversary of Giuseppe Tartini's birth, blueprints of old gravestones including the one belonging to Tartini's family, were found in the monastery's archives.

Architecture
Leading to the cloister there is a half-arched portal adorned with richly carved columns, bearing an architrave with an inscription and coats of arms.

Musical events
The atrium of the monastery has been for decades the venue for Musical Evenings of Piran events.

References

17th-century Roman Catholic church buildings in Slovenia
Cultural monuments of Slovenia
Renaissance architecture in Slovenia